Jharna Bajracharya (Nepalese: झरना बज्राचार्य) is a Nepalese film actress. She was crowned Miss Nepal in 1997, at the age of sixteen.

Early life 

Jharana Bajracharya completed her schooling from Siddhartha Vanasthali Institute. She is also a painter and potter and she holds a degree in sociology. Her mother is Mrs. Lalana Bajracharya who holds a degree in psychology. Jharana's father's surname is Rashid and is a Nepalese Muslim. Her real name is Jharana Bajracharya Rashid. She started her journey in the Nepali entertainment field after being crowned Miss Nepal in 1997 at the age of 16 and represented Nepal in Miss World contest held at Baie Lazare, Seychelles on November 22, 1997. Jharana Bajracharya, made her debut in Hatiyar playing the second fiddle to the leading lady Karishma Manandhar co-starring opposite Rajesh Hamal.

Career 
After starring in Pareni Maya Jalaima which won the best story award at the Nepali Film Awards, Jharana promptly made her way into Mumbai to find her place in Bollywood. She appeared in Hindi film Love in Nepal and many other advertisements. After she could not make a niche in Bollywood, she returned to Nepal.
She has appeared in many music videos as well. Her last Nepali film was Kohi Mero which was released in mid 2010. Jharana Bajracharya appeared at the Fem Botanica KTV film awards in October 2008 where she performed with Alok Nembang on several songs.

Brand ambassador 
Jharana Bajracharya appeared as the Nepalese brand ambassador for Lux soap in 2003,.

Music video appearances
 2006: "Priye Timi" by Bijay  Adhikari.
 2006: "Tapowan" by Jagdish.
 2007: "Dubna Deu" by Anil Singh.
 2007: "Tum Sang Remix" (Hindi Song).
 2007: "Binti Cha Hai" by Prakash Gurung (Gurung Song).
 2004: "Dubna Deu Malai" by Anil Singh.
 2010: "Laija Re" by Hemanta Rana
 2012: "Manda Manda" by Manu Limbu
 2013: "Panchhi" by The Outsiders
 2013: "Bachunjelilai" by Ram Krishna Dhakal and Lata Mangeskar
 2013: "Aaja Pani Timrai" by Yateesh M. Acharya and Maya Roka Pradhan

Filmography

Personal life 
Bajracharya married Rahul Agrawal in March 2015.

References

External links
Jharana Bajracharya - Nepalese Models & Actress 

1981 births
Living people
Actors from Kathmandu
Nepalese film actresses
Nepalese expatriate actresses in India
Actresses in Hindi cinema
Actresses in Nepali cinema
Nepalese female models
Miss Nepal winners
Nepalese beauty pageant winners
Miss World 1997 delegates
21st-century Nepalese actresses
20th-century Nepalese actresses